Hassan Mohammed Osama Al-Tambakti (born 9 February 1999) is a Saudi Arabian footballer who plays as a centre-back for Saudi Pro League side Al-Shabab and the Saudi Arabia national team.

Career

Club
Al-Tambakti is an academy graduate of Al-Shabab and signed his first professional contract with the club on 31 May 2018. He renewed his contract on 5 February 2019, signing a one-year contract extension. He made his debut for the first team in the King Cup match against Al-Sahel on 2 January 2019. On 31 August 2019, Al-Tambakti was loaned out to fellow Pro League side Al-Wehda. He made his debut for Al-Wehda on 27 September 2019 in the league match against Al-Fateh. He made eight appearances for Al-Wehda before returning to Al-Shabab following the conclusion of the season.

International 
Al-Tambakti was first called up to Saudi Arabia national football team in 2019 for the game against Singapore in the 2022 FIFA World Cup qualification – AFC Second Round, but did not play. He made his debut for the Green Falcons against Paraguay on 19 November in a friendly. Throughout the qualification, Al-Tambakti didn't play a major role as Saudi Arabia qualified with an impressive result.

Despite lack of time playing for the senior side in the qualifiers, his strong performance for the U-23 team as Saudi Arabia won the 2022 AFC U-23 Asian Cup allowed him to be included in the final tournament. He gave a great impression in the first game against Argentina as he played a small but instrumental role in helping Saudi Arabia to stun Argentina with a historic 2–1 win. However, Al-Tambakti would go on to become the reason for Saudi Arabia's eventual group stage exit, as his foul on Henry Martín in the match against Mexico was utilisied by Luis Chávez, who scored a thunderous free kick as Saudi Arabia crumbled to Mexico by the same scoreline and finished in the bottom place.

Career statistics

Club

Honours

International
Saudi Arabia U20
 AFC U-19 Championship: 2018
Saudi Arabia U23
AFC U-23 Asian Cup: 2022

References

External links
 

1999 births
Living people
Sportspeople from Riyadh
Saudi Arabian footballers
Association football defenders
Saudi Professional League players
Al-Shabab FC (Riyadh) players
Al-Wehda Club (Mecca) players
Saudi Arabia youth international footballers
Saudi Arabia international footballers
2022 FIFA World Cup players